The Return of Monte Cristo is a 1946 swashbuckler film which is a sequel to The Count of Monte Cristo (1934) and The Son of Monte Cristo (1940).

Plot
The grandson of the Count of Monte Cristo is falsely accused of a crime and imprisoned on Devil's Island. He escapes and seeks revenge against those responsible for his imprisonment.

Cast
 Louis Hayward as Dantes
 George Macready as Henri de la Rouche
 Barbara Britton as Angela Picard
 Una O'Connor as Miss Beedle
 Henry Stephenson as Prof. Duval 
 Steven Geray as Bombelles 
 Ray Collins as Emil Blanchard 
 Ludwig Donath as Judge Lafitte 
 Ivan Triesault as Major Chavet 
 Ethan Laidlaw as Cab Driver (uncredited)

Production
Edward Small made the film in collaboration with Columbia Studios, using an old commitment he had with Louis Hayward. Hayward was paid $35,000.

Reception
Reviews were positive. Edward Small announced plans to star Louis Hayward in The Treasure of Monte Cristo but no film resulted. There were films called The Treasure of Monte Cristo released in 1949 and 1961 but not from Small.

References

External links
 
 
 

1946 films
American swashbuckler films
1940s historical adventure films
Films based on The Count of Monte Cristo
Films set in the 1860s
Films set on Devil's Island
Columbia Pictures films
Films produced by Edward Small
American historical adventure films
American black-and-white films
Films directed by Henry Levin
1940s English-language films
1940s American films